Manuke is a village on Guru Gobind Singh Marg (highway) in district Ludhiana, state of Punjab, India. It is one of the largest village in Jagraon block. The world-famous Gurdwara Mehdiana Sahib is situated outside the village on the west. The village is populated mostly by Sandhu families. It has two main Gurdwara's, Shivdwala, and a Maseet. One of the Gurdwaras, Patshahi Dasvee, is believed to have been visited by Guru Gobind Singh himself. The village has built a state of the art modern funeral home.

For education the village has 2 government primary schools, along with several English medium privately run primary schools. There are also 2 High Schools up to +2. In addition there are two ITI’s(Industrial Technical Institute). The majority of the town's inhabitants are Sikhs, but there are some Hindu, Muslim, and Christian people living there as well.
Villages in Ludhiana district